Brian O'Byrne may refer to:
 Bryan O'Byrne (1931–2009), American character actor
 Brían F. O'Byrne (born 1967), Irish-born actor based in the United States

See also
 Brian Beirne (born 1946), American radio DJ
Brian Byrne (disambiguation)
 Brian Burns (disambiguation)